Ophiodes enso is a species of lizard of the Diploglossidae family. It is found in Brazil.

References

Ophiodes
Reptiles described in 2017
Reptiles of Brazil
Endemic fauna of Brazil